Team VVCS is the football team  of the Vereniging van Contractspelers (Association of contract Players) (VVCS) for professional footballers in the Netherlands without a contract. It was set up in 2004.

History
During the preparation to the new football season Team VVCS organises a few practice matches with football clubs. In this way the players try to earn a contract at another club. In 2018, eight of the 16 players received contracts.

Former players and managers of Team VVCS

References

External links 
 VVCS

WCS
2004 establishments in the Netherlands